King You of Zhou (795–771 BC), personal name Ji Gongsheng, was the twelfth king of the Chinese Zhou dynasty and the last of Western Zhou Dynasty. He reigned from 781 to 771 BC.

History
In 780 BC, a major earthquake hit Guanzhong. A soothsayer named Bo Yangfu (伯陽甫) considered this an omen foretelling the destruction of the Zhou Dynasty.

In 779 BC, a concubine named Bao Si entered the palace and came into the King You's favour. She bore him a son named Bofu. King You deposed Queen Shen (申后) and Crown Prince Yijiu. He made Baosi the new queen and Bofu the new crown prince.

It is said that Baosi did not laugh easily. After trying many methods and failing, King You tried to amuse his favorite queen by lighting warning beacons and fooling his nobles into thinking that the Quanrong nomads were about to attack. The nobles arrived at the castle only to find themselves laughed at by Baosi. Even after King You had impressed Baosi, he continued to abuse his use of warning beacons and lost the trust of the nobles.

Queen Shen's father, the Marquess of Shen, was furious at the deposition of his daughter and grandson Crown Prince Yijiu and mounted an attack on King You's palace with the Quanrong. King You called for his nobles using the previously abused beacons but none came. In the end, King You and Bofu were killed and Baosi was captured.

After King You died, nobles including the Marquess of Shen, the Marquess of Zeng (繒侯) and Duke Wen of Xu (許文公) supported the deposed Prince Yijiu as King Ping of Zhou to continue the Zhou Dynasty. As the national capital Haojing had suffered severe damage, and was located near the potentially dangerous Quanrong, in 771 BC, King Ping of Zhou moved the capital eastward to Luoyang, thus beginning the Eastern Zhou Dynasty and ushering in the Spring and Autumn period which would last for more than 300 years.

In literature
In the traditional Mao Commentary to the Shijing, the minor court hymn "Cai Shu" (采菽) is said to be a criticism of King You for squandering feudal lords' respect and humiliating them, although this interpretation is disputed.

Family
Queens:
 Queen Shen, of the Jiang clan of Shen, a daughter of the Marquis of Shen; the mother of Crown Prince Yijiu
 Bao Si, of the Du lineage of the Qi clan of Bao (791–771 BC), a daughter of Du Bo; married in 779 BC; the mother of Crown Prince Bofu

Sons:
 Crown Prince Yijiu (d. 720 BC), ruled as King Ping of Zhou from 770–720 BC
 Crown Prince Bofu (779–771 BC)

Ancestry

See also
 Family tree of ancient Chinese emperors

References

795 BC births
771 BC deaths
Zhou dynasty kings
8th-century BC Chinese monarchs